Besha Tuffa (born 9 October 1953) is an Ethiopian sprinter. He competed in the men's 100 metres at the 1980 Summer Olympics.

References

1953 births
Living people
Athletes (track and field) at the 1980 Summer Olympics
Ethiopian male sprinters
Olympic athletes of Ethiopia
Place of birth missing (living people)